Concord is a suburban industrial district in the City of Vaughan in York Region, located north of Toronto, Ontario, Canada. According to the 2001 Census, Concord has 8,255 residents.

It is accessed by two provincial highways: Highway 407 and Highway 400. Concord's approximate boundaries are Steeles Avenue to the south, Highway 400
to the west, Dufferin Street to the east, and Rutherford Road to the north, though it includes the Carrville neighbourhood east to Bathurst Street between Rutherford and Highway 7. The area along Highway 7, from Highway 400 to just east of Jane Street, though still often considered by many to be part of Concord, is now officially a new district, the Vaughan Metropolitan Centre, which is Vaughan's planned urban core.

History
Concord became a postal village in 1854 when John Duncan became postmaster at the northwest corner of Dufferin Street and Centre Street. The area's name is likely linked to Hiram White (1788-1859) who came to Vaughan from Concord, Vermont in 1818. White farmed in the area (Lot 8 Concession 3) north of the village. The Northern Railway of Canada established a stop at Thornhill in 1853, located to the north of present-day Highway 7 along the GO Barrie line. In 1853, Canadian Northern Railway renamed the stop Concord. It was closed in the 1960s and demolished by CNR in 1978. The village had two churches (Concord Methodist Church and Cober Dunkard Church) in the 1880s and a school in 1842.  By the 1930s, the 19th century school buildings and all other village structures were demolished.

Prior to the opening of Highway 400 in the 1950s, Concord was an agricultural community, covered mostly by farmlands. This decade also saw industrial development stretching west to Jane Street south of Highway 7. as well as construction of a Canadian National Railway by-pass of Toronto with a major freight yard, MacMillan Yard. 
In the 1970s, the industrialization and commercialization of the northern part of the district began, mostly along Highway 7 and Keele, with development continuing into the 2000s. A residential area, Glen Shields, was built in the 1970s and 1980s in the southeast, west of Dufferin. Construction of Highway 407 commenced in the mid-1990s and opened in 1997, with three Concord interchanges. Another residential section, Dufferin Hill, was built in the 2000s in the northeast, near Dufferin and Rutherford. In the early 2000s, construction of the Vaughan Mills shopping mall began, being completed in 2004.

Until the opening of Canada's Wonderland to the north in Maple in 1981, when an interchange was constructed at Rutherford Road to provide better access to the theme park, Concord had only one interchange, at Highway 7. A third was added in 1996 when a partial interchange at Langstaff Road was opened, and three more were opened following the completion of the tolled Highway 407 in 1997. A partial interchange, connecting Highway 400 with Vaughan Mills, opened several years later. Today, Concord has eight interchanges, of which three connect with the toll highway, two are partial, one is a four-level stack and the other two connect to the 400. A plan for an interchange at Centre Street was proposed, but was later cancelled.

Much of Concord is industrial while empty spaces remain in the southern part, in the Black Creek and 407 area, and along the CN railway line. Wooded areas are located in the north and within Black Creek and along the Don River. One tract of forest is located to the northwest. All main roads except for Langstaff east of Creditstone Road are four-lane roadways,

Concord is the main industrial district of Vaughan. Many large multi-national and domestic corporations have headquarters there, including Toys R Us Canada. and Tootsie Roll Industries. Its access to several major highways is a key factor in the locations of these businesses.

Proposed Concord GO Centre
The draft Concord GO Centre secondary plan was presented in an open house for the public on November 4, 2013. The plan is for a new GO Transit station and a development with mixed uses and multimodal transportation access, including residential, commercial, and recreational areas, cycling trails, and connections to several transportation systems. The site is bounded by Rivermede Road on the north, the electrical power corridor to the south and east, Bowes Road on the west north of Highway 7, and the Barrie line railway tracks on the west south of Highway 7. The area to be developed consists of the land immediately adjacent to the intersection of Highway 7 and the Barrie line railway tracks.

The plan enables the location of a railway station for the Barrie line, but does not incorporate it into the design. Creation of the station and its location are the responsibility of Metrolinx, which would have to complete an environmental assessment for a potential station. The plan also provides provisions for a Viva bus station, but does not incorporate it into the design.

Education
Public schools in the area are managed by the York Region District School Board, while Catholic schools are managed by the York Region Catholic District School Board.

Public elementary
Glen Shields Public School
Forest Run Public School
Wilshire Elementary School (c. 1994)

Concord Public School (now Patrica Kemp Community Centre) on Dufferin Street was the area's first public school. The school dated back to an 1842 log schoolhouse, replaced by a brick schoolhouse in the 1880s. The second school burned down in 1930 and was replaced by current structure in 1931.

Catholic
Our Lady of the Rosary Catholic School

Post-secondary
Yorkville University-Toronto Film School
Niagara University

Surrounding neighbourhoods
Woodbridge
Maple
Thornhill
Vaughan Metropolitan Centre
York University Heights (City of Toronto)

Notes

References

 

Neighbourhoods in Vaughan